Sea Island may refer to:
Sea Island (British Columbia), an island in Richmond, British Columbia that contains the Vancouver International Airport
Sea Island, Georgia, an isolated resort island in Glynn County, Georgia, United States
Sea Islands, a chain of islands in the Southeastern United States
Sea Island Cotton, a type of cotton fibre
Sea Island Export Terminal, near Ras Tanura